1972 saw humanity's last crewed mission to the Moon of the 20th century, Apollo 17.

Launches
This is a list of spaceflights launched in 1972.

Launches from the Moon 

|}

Deep space rendezvous in 1972 
February 21 – Luna 20, 55g from Apollonius Crater  (sample return mission)
April 21 – Apollo 16, 95 kg from Descartes Highlands (sample return mission)
July 22 – Venera 8 atmospheric probe worked for 50 min on the Venerian surface
December 11 – Apollo 17, 111 kg from Taurus–Littrow (sample return mission)

References

Footnotes

 
Spaceflight by year